Aprosphylus is a genus of katydids found in southern Africa.

It contains the following species:
 Aprosphylus olszanowskii Naskrecki, 1994 – Olszanowski's black-kneed katydid
 Aprosphylus hybridus Pictet, 1888 – Namibian black-kneed katydid
 Aprosphylus sopatarum Naskrecki, 1994 – Sopatas' black-kneed katydid

References

Mecopodinae
Orthoptera of Africa
Tettigoniidae genera